Darko Karapetrović (born 17 March 1976) is a retired Slovenian footballer and manager.

Career

He started playing in Slovenia for Olimpija in the Slovenian PrvaLiga, where he also played for Slavija Vevče, Domžale, Tabor Sežana, Ljubljana, Bela Krajina and Livar. He also played in the First League of FR Yugoslavia in the 1998–99 season, for the previous year champions Obilić, and with Radnički Niš in the same season. He also played in the Austrian Erste Liga for SV Ried and SC Schwanenstadt, in 2005.

He has been playing in the Slovenian lower leagues for Krško and Radomlje.

He was part of the Slovenia national under-21 football team in the 1990s.

Coaching career
Karapetrović left his manager position at NK Brežice 1919 in summer 2019 and was then immediately appointed assistant manager of Andrej Razdrh at NK Tabor Sežana. However, the duo left by mutual agreement on 4 September 2019. The following day, the duo was presented at NK Domžale. They was fired in June 2020.

References

External links
National team stats at NZS 
Club stats at NZS 

1976 births
Living people
Footballers from Ljubljana
Slovenian footballers
Association football midfielders
NK Olimpija Ljubljana (1945–2005) players
NK Ljubljana players
NK Domžale players
Slovenian expatriate footballers
Slovenian expatriate sportspeople in Serbia and Montenegro
Expatriate footballers in Serbia and Montenegro
FK Obilić players
FK Radnički Niš players
Slovenian expatriate sportspeople in Austria
Expatriate footballers in Austria
SV Ried players
NK Ivančna Gorica players
NK Krško players
NK Radomlje players
Slovenian PrvaLiga players
Slovenian Second League players
2. Liga (Austria) players
Slovenia youth international footballers
Slovenia under-21 international footballers
NK Olimpija Ljubljana (2005) managers
Slovenian football managers